KCCC may refer to:

 Kansas City Country Club
 Kent County Cricket Club
 Kandy Customs Cricket Club
 KCCC (AM), a radio station (930 AM) licensed to Carlsbad, New Mexico, United States
 KCCC-LP, a low-power radio station (98.5 FM) formerly licensed to Hays, Kansas, United States
 KCCC-TV, a television station (channel 40) formerly licensed to Sacramento, California, United States
 Kalamazoo Chinese Christian Church, Chinese Church at Kalamazoo, Michigan, United States
 Kuwait Cancer Control Centre